Click-N-Ship is a service offered by the United States Postal Service that allows customers to create pre-paid Priority Mail shipping labels on ordinary printer paper.  The labels include delivery confirmation numbers to track date and time of delivery or attempted delivery. Other than the cost of postage, there is no fee to create labels for Priority Mail, Priority Mail Express, Global Priority Mail, or Global Express Mail if the sender uses USPS Flat Rate envelopes or boxes.

After affixing the label, customers may ship a package by depositing it in a USPS collection box, bringing it to a post office, giving it to their regular mail carrier, or requesting a pickup.

Notes

References

External links 
 Click-N-Ship

United States Postal Service